Turricostellaria lindae is a species of sea snail, a marine gastropod mollusk, in the family Costellariidae, the ribbed miters.

Description
Original description: "General shell form as for genus; suture very incised, with squared-off subsutural band producing extreme tabulate appearance; spire scalariform; whorls with narrow, well-defined axial ribs; axial ribs overlaid, on body whorl, with 6 spiral impressed sulci and numerous fine spiral threads; color pale grayish-white."

Distribution
Locus typicus: "Off Cabo La Vela, Goajira Peninsula, Colombia."

References

Costellariidae